Elizabeth River may refer to:

Elizabeth River (New Jersey), a tributary of the Arthur Kill
Elizabeth River (Virginia), an estuary of Chesapeake Bay
Elizabeth River, New Zealand, a river in Fiordland
Elizabeth River (Northern Territory), a river near Darwin in the Northern Territory
Elizabeth River, Tasmania, a tributary of the Macquarie River